Agustín Álvarez Wallace (born 20 April 2001) is a Uruguayan professional footballer who plays as a midfielder for Montevideo City Torque.

Club career
Álvarez joined the youth academy of Peñarol in 2005. He made his professional debut for the club on 27 July 2019 in a 2–0 league win against Danubio.

On 3 February 2023, Álvarez joined Montevideo City Torque on a permanent deal until December 2027.

International career
Álvarez is a former Uruguayan youth international.

Personal life
Álvarez is the brother of former Uruguayan youth international Elbio Álvarez.

Career statistics

Honours
Peñarol
 Uruguayan Primera División: 2021
 Supercopa Uruguaya: 2022

Uruguay U20
 South American Games silver medal: 2018

References

External links
 

2001 births
Living people
Footballers from Montevideo
Association football midfielders
Uruguayan footballers
Uruguay youth international footballers
Uruguayan Primera División players
Peñarol players
Montevideo City Torque players
South American Games silver medalists for Uruguay
South American Games medalists in football